There are 73 primary schools and 26 secondary schools in Saint Lucia. Sir Arthur Lewis Community College caters to students preparing for Cambridge post-secondary examinations.

All but three of the secondary schools in Saint Lucia are run by the Government of Saint Lucia through the Ministry of Education. St. Joseph's Convent and St. Mary's college are jointly run by the Ministry of Education and the Catholic Board of Education. The Seventh Day Adventist Academy is run by the Seventh Day Adventist Church. The International School St. Lucia is affiliated with Canada (New Brunswick and Ontario), The Montessori Centre St Lucia and Bonne Terre Preparatory School are privately run.

All but three of Saint Lucia's secondary schools are co-ed. St. Joseph's Convent is an all girls school. St. Mary's College is an all boys school.
The Girl's Vocational School is an all girls school. Ave Maria Primary and RC Boy's primary are the all girls and all boys primary schools respectively.

Saint Lucia's first secondary school, St. Joseph's Convent, was founded by the Sisters of St. Joseph of Cluny in 1854.

The University of The West Indies offers a Challenge programme in Saint Lucia, administered at the campus of Sir Arthur Lewis Community College. Monroe College operates a campus in Saint Lucia.

There are three medical schools in Saint Lucia – American International Medical University, International American University, and Spartan Health Sciences University School of Medicine.

Schools

Tertiary
University of the West Indies
Monroe College
Sir Arthur Lewis Community College
American International Medical University
International American University College of Medicine
Spartan Health Sciences University School of Medicine
Lynchburg College St. Lucia
University of the Southern Caribbean Saint Lucia Branch

Secondary
Anse Ger Secondary School, Micoud
Babonneau Secondary School, Babonneau
Bocage Secondary School, Bocage, Castries
Beanfield Comprehensive Secondary School, Vieux Fort
Bonne Terre Preparatory School 
Castries Comprehensive Secondary School, Vide Boutielle, Castries
Choiseul Secondary School, La Fargue, Choiseul
Ciceron Secondary School, Ciceron, Castries
Clendon Mason Memorial Secondary School, Dennery
Corinth Secondary School, Corinth, Gros Islet
Entrepot Secondary School, Castries
George Charles Secondary School, Cul de Sac, Castries
 Grande Riviere Secondary School, Grande Riviere, Dennery
Gros Islet Secondary School, Beausejour, Gros Islet
International School St. Lucia (private, Canadian), Rodney Heights, Gros Islet
Jon Odlum Secondary School (formerly Marigot Secondary School), Marigot, Castries
Leon Hess Comprehensive Secondary School, Entrepot, Castries
Micoud Secondary School, Micoud
Piaye Secondary School, Piaye, Laborie
Saint Lucia Seventh Day Adventist Academy, Sunny Acres, Castries
St. Joseph's Convent, Cedars, Castries
St. Mary's College, Vigie, Castries
Sir Ira Simmons Secondary School, Vide Boutielle, Castries
Soufriere Comprehensive Secondary School, Soufriere
Vide Bouteille Secondary School, La Clery, Castries
Vieux Fort Comprehensive Secondary School, Vieux Fort

Primary
Anse La Raye Infant & Primary School, Anse La Raye
Augier Combined School, Augier, Vieux-Fort
Aux Leon Combined, Aux Leon, Dennery
Ave Maria Primary School, Broglie St., Castries
Babonneau Primary School, Babonneau
Balata Primary School, Balata, Babonneau
Banse La Grace Combined, Laborie
Belle Vue Combined, Belle Vue, Vieux-Fort
Bexon R.C. Infant & Primary School, Bexon, Castries
Blanchard Combined School, Blanchard, Micoud
Bouton Primary School, Bouton, Soufriere
Bocage Combined School, Bocage, Castries 
Boguis Primary School, Boguis, Babonneau
Canaries Infant School, Canaries
Canaries Primary School, Canaries
Camille Henry Memorial School, L'anse Road, Castries
Canon Laurie Anglican Infant & Primary Schools, Trinity Church Road, Castries
Carmen Rene Memorial School, Sans Souci, Castries
Ciceron R.C. Combined School, Ciceron, Castries
Dame Pearlette Louisy Primary School, Union, Gros Islet
Delcer R.C. Combined School, Delcer, Choiseul
Dennery Combined, Dennery
Desruisseaux Combined School, Desruisseaux, Micoud
Dugard Combined School, Dugard, Choiseul
Des Barras Combined School, Des Barras, Babonneau
Emmanuel Seventh-day Adventist Combined School, Mon-Repos, Micoud
Eucharist Lewis Seventh-day Adventist Primary School, Sunny Acres, Castries
Fond Assau Primary School, Fond Assau, Babonneau
Gordon and Walcott Memorial Methodist School, Darling Road, Castries
Grace Combined, Grace, Vieux-Fort
Grande-Riviere Primary School, Grande-Riviere, Gros Islet
Gros Islet Primary School, Gros Islet
International School St. Lucia (private), Rodney Heights, Gros Islet
La Croix Maingot Primary School, La Croix Maingot, Castries
La Guerre Primary School, La Guerre, Babonnneau
La  Combined, La , Dennery
Laborie Girls & Boys Primary, Laborie
L'Abayee Seventh-day Adventist Primary School, L'Abayee Castries
 Les Etangs Combined School, Soufriere
Millet R.C. Infant & Primary School, Millet
Monchy Combined School, Monchy, Gros Islet
Mongouge Combined School, Ponyon, Choiseul
Mon-Repos Combined, Mon-Repos, Micoud
The Montessori Centre, Rodney Heights, Gros Islet 
Morne Du Don Government Combined School, Morne Du Don, Castries 
Micoud Primary School, Micoud
Odsan Combined School, Odsan, Castries 
Patience Combined, Patience, Mon Repos, Micoud
Plain View Combined, La  Vieux-Fort
Piaye Combined School, Piaye, Choiseul
Pierrot Combined School, Pierrot, Vieux-Fort
Reunion Primary School, Reunion, Choiseul
Richford Primary, Richford, Dennery
Riviere Doree Anglican, Riviere Doree, Micoud
Roblot Government Combined School, Roblot, Laborie
Roseau R.C. Combined School, Jacmel, Roseau
Saltibus Combined School, Saltibus, Choiseul
Soufriere Primary School, Soufriere
St. Aloysius R.C. Boys Infant & Primary School, Brazil St., Castries
Tapion Infant & Primary School, Tapion, Castries
The Montessori Centre (private school), Rodney Heights, Gros-Islet
Ti-Rocher Combined School, Ti-Rocher, Micoud
Ti-Rocher Primary School, Ti-Rocher, Castries
Vide Boutielle Primary School, La Clery, Castries
Vieux-Fort Primary, Vieux-Fort

References

Schools
Saint Lucia
Schools

Saint Lucia